Jamie Jermaine Bynoe-Gittens (born 8 August 2004) is an English professional footballer who plays as a forward for Bundesliga club Borussia Dortmund.

Club career

Early life
Born in London, Bynoe-Gittens started his career with local side Caversham Trents at the age of five, and stayed until he was seven. Shortly after, he joined Reading, and also spent some time with Chelsea. At under-9 level, he chose to remain with Reading, and stayed there until under-14 level, when he chose to sign with Manchester City.

Borussia Dortmund
After two years in Manchester, Bynoe-Gittens moved to Germany in 2020 to sign for Borussia Dortmund. His career in Dortmund was hampered by not only the COVID-19 pandemic, but a torn ligament injury that kept him out for a number of months. However, the 2021–22 season was a much better one for Bynoe-Gittens; notable performances in the UEFA Youth League, where he scored six goals in four games, including two against Manchester United, earned him a call-up to Marco Rose's first team squad.

Bynoe-Gittens made his Bundesliga debut in a 6–1 win over VfL Wolfsburg on 16 April 2022.

2022–23 season
On 12 August 2022, he scored his first Bundesliga goal in a 3–1 away win against SC Freiburg. On 16 August, Bynoe-Gittens signed a new contract until June 2025.

International career
Bynoe-Gittens has represented England at numerous youth levels. He is of Barbadian descent.

On 17 June 2022, Bynoe-Gittens was included in the England U19 squad for the 2022 UEFA European Under-19 Championship. He made his U19 debut as an 80th minute substitute during England's opening game of the tournament, a 2–0 victory over Austria in Banská Bystrica, Slovakia. He made his first start at this age level in their next group game against Serbia and received praise for his performance in the semi-final against Italy. Bynoe-Gittens started in the final as England won the tournament with a 3–1 extra time victory over Israel on 1 July 2022.

Career statistics

Honours
England U19
 UEFA European Under-19 Championship: 2022

References

External links
Profile at the Borussia Dortmund website

2004 births
Living people
Footballers from Greater London
English sportspeople of Barbadian descent
English footballers
England youth international footballers
Association football forwards
Bundesliga players
Reading F.C. players
Chelsea F.C. players
Manchester City F.C. players
Borussia Dortmund players
English expatriate footballers
English expatriate sportspeople in Germany
Expatriate footballers in Germany
Black British sportspeople